Slam City may refer to:

Film and TV
Pitch Black: Slam City, a 2000 animated short film
WWE Slam City, an animated show produced by WWE

Other
Slam City Jam, a North American skateboarding championship
Slam City with Scottie Pippen, the first FMV basketball video game